Rasmus Lindh (born 6 July 2001, in Gothenburg) is a Swedish racing car driver who is competing in Indy NXT in 2023 for HMD Motorsports with Dale Coyne Racing in the #10 car sponsored by GarageXYZ . Lindh previously competed in the then Indy Lights for Juncos Hollinger Racing.

Career

Karting
Born in Gothenburg, Lindh began his career in karting at the age of six before going professional in 2009, collecting numerous titles in his native Sweden as well as partaking in the CIK-FIA European championships with the likes of Birel ART and Ricciardo Kart Racing.

Road to Indy

USF2000
In October 2017, Lindh partook in the USF2000 category of the Chris Griffis Memorial Test with Team BENIK. Three months later, it was confirmed Lindh would make his single-seater debut in the 2018 season with Pabst Racing Services. Despite coming away without a win, Lindh achieved three pole positions and five podiums to finish as vice-champion to Kyle Kirkwood.

Pro Mazda/Indy Pro 2000
In September 2018, Lindh partook in the Pro Mazda category of the Chris Griffis Memorial Test with Juncos Racing. In February 2019, it was announced Lindh would race with Juncos in the newly re-branded Indy Pro 2000 Championship. In the first race at the Indianapolis GP, Lindh claimed his maiden single-seater win after starting from pole position. He achieved one final victory in the second race at Laguna Seca and once again finished as championship runner-up to Kirkwood.

Indy Lights
In October 2019, Lindh was named as one of Andretti Autosport's entrants in the Chris Griffis Memorial test. Two months later, Lindh joined HMD Motorsports for the second test at Sebring, setting the fastest time of the test. In March 2020, it was announced Lindh would partake in the Spring Training session at Homestead with Belardi Auto Racing who subsequently named him as their first driver signing for the 2020 season, which would subsequently be cancelled due to the COVID-19 pandemic.  On September 8, 2021, it was reported on the RACER web site that Lindh had rejoined Juncos Hollinger Racing for rest of the 2021 Indy Lights season.

Lindh will return to Indy Lights, rebranded as Indy NXT, in 2023 with a full-time seat at HMD Motorsports in the #10 car sponsored by GarageXYZ.

Racing record

Career summary

* Season still in progress.

U.S. F2000 National Championship

{| class="wikitable" style="text-align:center; font-size:90%"
! Year
! Team
! 1
! 2
! 3
! 4
! 5
! 6
! 7
! 8
! 9
! 10
! 11
! 12
! 13
! 14
! Rank
! Points
|-
| 2018
! Pabst Racing Services
|style="background:#CFEAFF;"| STP
|style="background:#EFCFFF;"| STP
|style="background:#CFCFFF;"| IMS
|style="background:#FFDF9F;"| IMS
|style="background:#FFDF9F;"| LOR
|style="background:#DFFFDF;"| ROA
|style="background:#EFCFFF;"| ROA
|style="background:#DFFFDF;"| TOR
|style="background:#FFDF9F;"| TOR
|style="background:#CFEAFF;"| MDO
|style="background:#DFFFDF;"| MDO
|style="background:#FFDF9F;"| MDO
|style="background:#DFFFDF;"| POR
|style="background:#DFDFDF;"| POR
!style="background:#DFDFDF;"| 2nd
!style="background:#DFDFDF;"| 238
|}

Indy Pro 2000 Championship

Indy NXT

Complete IMSA SportsCar Championship results
(key) (Races in bold' indicate pole position; races in italics'' indicate fastest lap)

† Points only counted towards the Michelin Endurance Cup, and not the overall LMP3 Championship.
* Season still in progress.

References

External links
 
 

2001 births
Living people
Sportspeople from Gothenburg
Swedish racing drivers
U.S. F2000 National Championship drivers
Indy Pro 2000 Championship drivers
Indy Lights drivers
24 Hours of Daytona drivers
WeatherTech SportsCar Championship drivers
Juncos Hollinger Racing drivers
Andretti Autosport drivers
Karting World Championship drivers
Dale Coyne Racing drivers
HMD Motorsports drivers